We're Lalaloopsy is an animated children's television series co-produced by MGA Entertainment, Splash Entertainment, and Netflix. The series is based on the Lalaloopsy dolls from MGA Entertainment, and is a revival of the children’s animated television series Lalaloopsy on Nickelodeon. It debuted on Netflix on January 10, 2017.

Premise
This Netflix Original series is a revival of Lalaloopsy, a Nick Jr. series that first aired in 2013. Although they both share the basic premise of rag dolls having adventures in Lalaloopsy Land, the exact details of each series vastly differ. 48 unique Lalaloopsies appeared in the original series. In contrast, We're Lalaloopsy only features 10 characters, a significant downgrade from 48.

The Netflix series also offers a more continuity based structure as opposed to the previous series's more episodic structure. We're Lalaloopsy mainly focuses on Storm E. Sky (who previously appeared in Lalaloopsy Girls: Welcome to L.A.L.A Prep School) gradually becoming accepted in Town Square, a section of Lalaloopsy Land.

Another difference from the original series is that We're Lalaloopsy has a different art style which is more shaded and emphasizes the dolls' facial features. Unlike Lalaloopsy, the Lalaloopsies are now voiced by adults.

Characters

Main
 Jewel Sparkles (voiced by Kazumi Evans) is a girly princess who loves tiaras and makeup. Her pet is a pink cat named Cat.
 Storm E. Sky (voiced by Mariee Devereux) is a punky guitarist with stage fright and thus doesn't like to sing in front of an audience. She is the newest resident of Lalaloopsy Land. She has a rivalry with Jewel, though they later become friends near the end of the series. Her pet is a purple cat with a black lightning bolt tail named Cool Cat.
 Crumbs Sugar Cookie (voiced by Jocelyne Loewen) is a baker. Her pet is a white mouse with a pink tail named Mouse.
 Dot Starlight (voiced by Maryke Hendrikse) is a smart stargazer and inventor. Her pet is a red bird with blue wings named Bird.
 Spot Splatter Splash (voiced by Sabrina Pitre) is an artist with a laid-back personality. Her pet is a red-and-white striped zebra named Zebra.
 Rosy Bumps 'N' Bruises (voiced by Diana Kaarina) is a nurse. Her pet is a brown bear named Bear wrapped in bandages with a heart-shaped medical patch over one eye.

Recurring
 Ace Fender Bender (voiced by Matt Hill) is a handyman. His pet is a brown monkey wearing a red bow named Monkey. Ace’s design is significantly different from his previous incarnation.
 Berry Jars 'N' Jam (voiced by Maryke Hendrikse) is a farmer and cook who is Sunny's younger twin sister. Her pet is a white cow with pink spots and a yellow bow on the tail named Cow.
 Sunny Side Up (voiced by Maryke Hendrikse) is a farmer and animal lover who is Berry's older twin sister. Her pet is a yellow chick wearing a pink bow on top of the feathery head and pink wings named Chick.
 Forest Evergreen (voiced by Samuel Vincent) is a lumberjack who loves maple syrup. His pet is a beaver wearing a red cap named Beaver.

Episodes

References

External links

 at Netflix

2010s American animated television series
2017 American television series debuts
2017 American television series endings
American children's animated adventure television series
American children's animated fantasy television series
American flash animated television series
Animated television series about children
English-language Netflix original programming
Netflix children's programming
Animated television series by Netflix
Television series by Splash Entertainment